The Sun Odyssey 33 is a French sailboat that was designed by Daniel Andrieu as a cruiser and first built in 1992.

The design is a development of the 1989 Sun Liberty 34.

Production
The design was built by Jeanneau in France, from 1992 until 1997, but it is now out of production.

Design
The Sun Odyssey 33 is a recreational keelboat, built predominantly of fiberglass, with wood trim. It has a fractional sloop rig. The hull has a raked stem, a reverse transom with steps and a swimming platform, an internally mounted spade-type rudder controlled by a wheel and a fixed fin keel. It displaces  and carries  of ballast.

The design was built with a two cabin or three cabin interior. The two cabin version has sleeping accommodation for four people, with a double "V"-berth in the bow cabin, a "U"-shaped settee and a straight settee in the main cabin and an aft cabin with a double berth on the starboard side. The galley is located on the port side just aft of the companionway ladder. The galley is "L"-shaped and is equipped with a three-burner stove, an ice box and a sink. A navigation station is forward of the galley, on the port side. The head is located opposite the navigation station on the starboard side.

The three cabin version has sleeping accommodation for six people, with a double "V"-berth in the bow cabin, a "U"-shaped settee in the main cabin and two aft cabins, each with a double berth. The galley is located on the port side, amidships. The straight galley is equipped with a three-burner stove, an ice box and a sink. A navigation station is aft of the galley, on the port side. The head is located opposite the navigation station on the starboard side.

For sailing downwind the design may be equipped with a symmetrical spinnaker.

See also
List of sailing boat types

References

External links

Photo of a Sun Odyssey 33 with spinnaker

Keelboats
1990s sailboat type designs
Sailing yachts
Sailboat type designs by Daniel Andrieu
Sailboat types built by Jeanneau